Roy Daniells,  (April 6, 1902 – April 13, 1979) was a Canadian poetry professor. He helped build the University of British Columbia's creative writing department and fostered the careers of several major Canadian writers.

Education and career
Daniells was born in London (UK) on April 6, 1902, but received the bulk of his education in Canada following his family's relocation to Victoria, BC in 1910. He attended University of British Columbia (UBC) and University of Toronto, receiving a Ph.D. from the latter in 1936. Thereafter, he worked at the University of Manitoba, heading its English department until 1946 when he took a position at his alma mater UBC. When Garnet Sedgewick retired in 1948, Daniells became department head, holding that post until 1965. During that time, he helped establish a Creative Writing Department at UBC and also promoted the university's funding of studies in Canadian Literature.

In 1965, Daniells was named the first University Professor of English Language and Literature. Daniells helped the writing careers of Margaret Avison, Earle Birney, Joy Coghill, Daryl Duke, Roderick Haig-Brown, Eli Mandel, Margaret Laurence, Eric Nicol, Sheila Watson, Phyllis Webb, Adele Wiseman, and George Woodcock, among others. He retired in 1974.

There is a biography of Daniells by author Sandra Djwa.

Publications
As an academic, Daniells had broad focus, specializing in John Milton and seventeenth century English literature, but also published widely on Canadian literature and history, including the 1969 volume Alexander Mackenzie and the North West (Great Travellers Series, London, Faber and Faber). He was also a poet with two published volumes.

Awards and honours
 first University Professor of English Language and Literature (1965)
 Lorne Pierce Medal (1970)
 Companion of the Order of Canada (1971)

Further reading

Sources
 Roy Daniells Fonds
 BC Bookworld: Roy Daniells

External links
 Roy Daniells at The Canadian Encyclopedia

1902 births
1979 deaths
Canadian literary critics
Companions of the Order of Canada
British emigrants to Canada
Fellows of the Royal Society of Canada
Writers from London
University of British Columbia alumni
Academic staff of the University of British Columbia
Academic staff of the University of Manitoba
University of Toronto alumni